Netaji Nagar may refer to:

 Netaji Nagar, Delhi
 Netaji Nagar, Kolkata